Typhoon Joan was the longest-lasting super typhoon at the time, maintaining 1-minute maximum sustained winds of at least  for 4.5 days. Joan, concurrently with Typhoon Ivan to its west, also became the strongest typhoons at the same time in the northwest Pacific Ocean. The 25th named storm during the active 1997 Pacific typhoon season, Joan developed from the same trough as Typhoon Ivan on October 11. It moved northwestward and later to the west, undergoing explosive deepening to its peak intensity on October 15. One typhoon warning agency estimated that Joan was among the strongest storms on record in the basin, and that Ivan and Joan marked the first occurrence of simultaneous super typhoons. While near peak intensity, Joan passed between Anatahan and Saipan in the Northern Marianas Islands. Later, the typhoon weakened and turned to the north and east, becoming extratropical on October 24.

On Saipan, Typhoon Joan destroyed 37 houses and caused an island-wide power outage. Three people were injured due to boarding up their house during the storm. On nearby Anatahan, high winds caused $200,000 (1997 USD) worth of crop and property damage. Later, high waves affected southern Japan and northwestern Hawaii. On Chichi-jima, Joan caused a boat to capsize, killing one of its occupants and leaving two others missing.

Meteorological history

In the first week of October 1997, westerly winds near the equator in the western Pacific Ocean produced troughs – extended areas of low pressure – at a low latitude in the northern and southern hemisphere. The system in the South Pacific eventually developed into Tropical Cyclone Lusi, while the trough in the northern hemisphere eventually spawned two systems – Typhoon Ivan formed to the west, and the system that would eventually become Typhoon Joan developed along the eastern periphery. By October 10, the eastern system consisted of an area of poorly-organized convection, moving slowly to the northwest. On the next day, satellite imagery suggested a circulation had developed. The system increased in size and the convection organized further, prompting the Joint Typhoon Warning Center (JTWC) to initiate advisories on Tropical Depression 28W on October 13. Also on that day, the Japan Meteorological Agency (JMA) estimated that a tropical depression had developed near the Marshall Islands.

After its development, the depression turned more to the west, intensifying into Tropical Storm Joan on October 14. Late on October 15, the JTWC upgraded Joan to typhoon status, and the JMA followed suit the next day. Near peak intensity, Joan had a well-defined eye within a circular area of very deep convection, organized to such an extent that it warranted a Dvorak rating of at least T8.0, the highest number on the scale used to estimate tropical cyclone intensities via satellite imagery. If the estimate were correct, it would make Joan among the top five Pacific typhoons on record.

Despite the proximity to Ivan, the two typhoons did not undergo the Fujiwhara effect. The JTWC estimated that Joan weakened slightly after reaching peak winds, although the JMA maintained the typhoon at peak intensity for nearly three whole days. Joan gradually turned more to the northwest, passing between Anatahan and Saipan in the Northern Marianas Islands (NMI) on October 18. On October 20, the JMA estimated that the typhoon began weakening, and on the same day Joan turned sharply to the north. On the next day, Joan weakened below super typhoon intensity for the first time in 4.5 days, a record at the time based on JTWC analysis. This record was later surpassed by Typhoon Fengshen in 2002 and Typhoon Ioke in 2006. By October 21, the typhoon had accelerated to the east and was quickly weakening. On October 24, the typhoon turned to the northeast while losing tropical characteristics, and that day the JMA ceased tracking Joan. The JTWC declared the typhoon as extratropical on October 25 around the same time it crossed the international date line. Former Typhoon Joan merged with a cold front and re-intensified while approaching the Aleutian Islands, and was noted by the Mariners Weather Log as an extratropical storm on October 26.

Impact

Residents were slow to prepare for the typhoon, and as a result, three people were injured while boarding up their house during the arrival of the strong winds. The passage of Joan left the entire island of Saipan without power, although electrical crews quickly worked to restore the outages. During the storm's passage, about 900 people stayed in shelters, after the government opened six schools for residents. In nearby Anatahan, Joan left heavy damage to boats, machinery, and public buildings. The typhoon damaged various crops, and monetary damage was estimated at $200,000 (1997 USD). As a result of the damage, both islands within the NMI were declared disaster areas, which allowed residents and businesses to apply for federal loans through the United States Small Business Administration.

The combination of strong winds and high waves on the island broke a boat from a moorings, causing it to capsize when the boat struck rocks. Of the five people on board, two swam safely to shore, two were reported missing, and one person was confirmed killed. The extratropical remnants of Joan also produced high swells in Hawaii, with wave heights of  along northern shores.

See also

Typhoon Hester (1952)
Typhoon Keith (1997)
Typhoon Fengshen (2002)
Typhoon Yuri (1991)

Notes

References

External links

JMA General Information of Typhoon Joan (9724) from Digital Typhoon
JMA Best Track Data (Graphics) of Typhoon Joan (9724)
JMA Best Track Data (Text)
JTWC Best Track Data of Super Typhoon 28W (Joan)
28W.JOAN from the U.S. Naval Research Laboratory

1997 Pacific typhoon season
Typhoons
Typhoons in Guam
Typhoons in the Northern Mariana Islands
October 1997 events